The Egg, or the Dome, is an unfinished cinema building in Beirut, Lebanon. Its construction began in 1965 but was interrupted with the outbreak the Lebanese Civil War in 1975 and the horse-shoe shaped dome that remains today is now a landmark in Beirut. It was part of a commercial and residential project named "Beirut City Center", by architect Joseph Philippe Karam.

Talk of its possible demolition in the 1990s and 2000s mobilized students and architects in favor of its preservation. The current owners of the site have affirmed their desire to preserve it and to integrate it into a new project.

During the Lebanese protests of 2019 and 2020, the Egg was used as a center for talks and lectures by academics, artists, and students among others. This was called "eggupation" by those participating in it. The talks included "Capitalism in Crisis" by Lebanese politician Charbel Nahhas which about 200 university students attended. Protest slogans were also written on the walls of the Egg including those calling for the "fall of the regime."

Gallery

References

External links

Buildings and structures in Beirut
Unfinished buildings and structures
Cinemas and movie theaters